Rose and Thorn are the two personalities of two characters (one in the Golden Age and one in the Silver Age) within publication of DC Comics. Before the Crisis on Infinite Earths, Rose Canton came from Earth-Two and Rose Forrest from Earth-One of the Multiverse.

Fictional character biography

Rose Canton

Thorn (Rose Canton) is a woman with a split personality whose villainous personality has the ability to control plants. Initially, she and her hired thugs opposed the Flash. After being (apparently) cured of her Thorn persona, Rose married Alan Scott and had two children, Jennie-Lynn Hayden and Todd James Rice by him. After a resurgence of her madness, she left Scott and put her children up for adoption, then went into seclusion for many years. She finally resurfaced and faced the Justice Society several times before her sanity returned, and she committed suicide.

As a child, Rose Canton used an imaginary friend, "Thorn", to deflect blame for bad things that she did. Over the years, Thorn developed as a distinct persona in Rose's head. As an adult, Rose was studying biology on the island of Tashmi, where she was exposed to the sap of a jungle root, which transformed her into Thorn. After killing her teacher, Professor Hollis, she reverted to Rose. Rose returned to America and settled in Keystone City where Thorn headed a gang which harassed the Flash. When she was in control, Rose would approach Jay for help, claiming to be Thorn's sister.

The Amazons of Paradise Island undertook her psychological treatment and apparently managed to rid Rose of the Thorn persona. During the time of her recovery, Rose developed a crush on Alan Scott. Dyeing her hair black, she assumed the identity of Alyx Florin and romantically pursued him, leading to their marriage. Tragedy struck when, on their honeymoon, Thorn returned. The personality of Rose was able to prevent Thorn from killing Alan, but she chose to run, preferring Alan to believe that she had perished in the fire that consumed their cabin. Their brief honeymoon resulted in the conception of twins, the children who were to become Jade and Obsidian. Fearful that Thorn might kill them, she gave the children up for adoption.

Thorn continued to fight Alan, who was still unaware of his wife's alter ego. On the island of Tashmi, she faced her husband and two children, both now adults. To keep Thorn from killing them, Rose fatally stabbed herself in the heart.

In 2011, The New 52 rebooted the DC universe. A one-shot take on Rose and Thorn was published as part of the National Comics line in September 2012, written by Tom Taylor and drawn by Neil Googe. This version is a teenage girl Rose Canton, who is just returning to school after being institutionalized following the death of her father. The shy Rose discovers that she has a violent and sexually adventurous split personality Thorn who is determined to find her father's murderers.

Rhosyn Lynne Forrest

A second character was created by writer Robert Kanigher and artist Ross Andru in the 12-page Lois Lane story "Death House Honeymoon" in Superman's Girl Friend, Lois Lane #105 (October 1970), with her own series, "Rose and the Thorn", debuting that issue as the title's backup feature.   

Rhosyn "Rose" Forrest is the daughter of Metropolis police officer Phil Forrest, who was killed by a criminal gang named The 100. When Rose went to sleep, her Thorn personality would emerge and stalk the streets as a vigilante, attempting to bring The 100 to justice. When she succeeds in bringing The 100 to justice, the "Thorn" personality subsides. Eventually, however, the gang escapes and forms another group, called The 1000, and her alternate personality resurfaces. She has since worked with Superman and Booster Gold to try to put these criminals behind bars. She was briefly under the control of Lord Satanus.

Thorn has no actual superpowers, but she is highly athletic and learned martial arts from her father. She is known to carry a pair of combat daggers, a barbed whip, and a bandolier of tiny, thorn-shaped weapons, some of which contain explosives, miniature smoke bombs, or blinding magnesium flares.

In the 1990s, Thorn appeared in a Green Arrow storyline written by Chuck Dixon. After trying to defeat a Metropolis crime lord, Thorn was defeated by Eddie Fyers and taken prisoner. After being tied up and gagged in a supply closet, Thorn reverted to her Rose persona and began to sob, frightened and confused about what was happening. Her sobs were heard by Green Arrow, who had rescued her earlier. They eventually teamed up to take down the crime lord after she returned to her Thorn persona.

When Harley Quinn and Poison Ivy moved to Metropolis, Thorn immediately attacked them. After a fierce battle, the women left Thorn hanging bound and gagged from a Superman statue in a local park for all of the citizens to see. During a later confrontation, Harley and Ivy defeat Thorn again, this time kidnapping her and keeping her tied up in their garden. After removing the vines from her mouth, Harley drugs Thorn into revealing the secrets about her multiple personality. Ivy then tortures Thorn in order to prove that she's weak, eventually leaving her in the care of Bizarro while she takes a break. Although, she is later rescued by Supergirl, who defeats Bizarro and unties Thorn. Supergirl later reveals that she just happened to stumble into the garden. Thorn and Supergirl later ambush and capture Ivy and turn her into the police. 

A 2004 Rose & Thorn miniseries by Gail Simone provided a slightly different origin story. In this version, The 100 killed both her parents, but Rhosyn was now revealed to have, at age 12, fought back and mutilated their murderer, Mr. Quince, cutting his hand off. She was then placed into a psychiatric care home, where she constantly flew into violent outbursts. Rhosyn's multiple personality is a result of unethical experimental treatments by a psychiatrist named Dr. Chritlow. The experiments forced her to repress her more violent, base emotions; these emotions were then given to the buried "Thorn" personality, who emerged whenever the submissive Rose felt angry or threatened. Her Thorn personality finally broke out after Rose's roommate Kimmy was burned to death by another patient. Enraged, Thorn viciously mutilated the culprit. Once released into the public, Thorn began taking over more frequently, taking up a role as an ultra-violent vigilante in a quest to take down The 100 and avenge her parents. By the end of the miniseries, it was hinted that she had killed the head of The 100 while he was in the hospital. 

In the miniseries, Gail Simone gave Rhosyn an uncle and godfather, Detective Curtis Leland, who was secretly taking bribes from The 100 and had been unable to stop them killing Rhosyn's parents. Wracked with guilt and determined to protect his goddaughter, he disposed of two 100 grunts that Thorn had dispatched. Curtis was killed while trying to prevent Quince from killing Rhosyn. In his final moments, he put a signed confession in his pocket so the police could arrest them.

It was also revealed that Rose and Thorn are not the only two personalities in Rhosyn's mind. The other two shown have been "Mom", a caring and maternal figure much like how Rose remembers their mother, and "Wild Rose", an Irish vigilante who is even more vicious and punitive than Thorn.

She encountered the Birds of Prey in the Hero Hunters storyline. As of Birds of Prey #98, she is employed at Dinah Lance's flower shop, Sherwood Florist II. Her most recent appearance was in Birds of Prey #108, where she makes an appearance as one of the heroines called in to confront and intimidate Spy Smasher.

In 2016, DC Comics implemented another relaunch of its books called DC Rebirth, which restored its continuity to a form much as it was prior to "The New 52". Rose and Thorn appeared in September 2019 as part of the relaunch of the Legion of Superheroes under Brian Michael Bendis and Szymon Kudranski. This version of Rose is likewise dual-personalitied, and had a few run-ins with various heroes (including at one point waking up in Arkham Asylum) before medication developed by Lex Luthor suppressed her Thorn Personality, allowing her to live a normal life and get married. Rose is immortal (though she did not notice until they stopped making the medicine she took to suppress her Thorn persona, as the condition was now genetically corrected at birth). She goes to an aged Supergirl for help, but apparently does not receive it as her Thorn personality is later seen going on a murderous rampage against the criminal element in Neo Gotham. She lives on Earth unaging for over 1000 years, encountering a number of other prominent future characters including Batman Beyond and Kamandi. She is important in the founding of the Legion.

Powers and abilities
Exposure to the sap of a rare tropical plant gave Rose Canton's Thorn personality limited control over plant life, especially those with thorny stalks. The sap was also responsible for physically transforming Rose into the evil Thorn. She also has the ability to spin rapidly like a top. Thorn also had Rose's extensive knowledge of botany and plant-related toxins.

The Rhosyn Lynne Forrest version of Thorn has multiple personalities and is skilled at hand-to-hand combat.

In other media
Thorn appears in Adventures in the DC Universe Annual #1.

References

External links
Thorn I's profile on Flash: Those Who Ride the Lightning
Thorn I's profile on The Unofficial Guide to the DC Universe
Thorn II's profile on The Unofficial Guide to the DC Universe

Articles about multiple fictional characters
Characters created by Carmine Infantino
Characters created by John Broome
Characters created by Robert Kanigher
Characters created by Ross Andru
Comics characters introduced in 1947
Comics characters introduced in 1970
DC Comics female superheroes
DC Comics female supervillains
DC Comics martial artists
DC Comics metahumans
DC Comics orphans
DC Comics scientists
Earth-Two
Fictional biologists
Fictional characters with dissociative identity disorder
Fictional characters with plant abilities
Fictional murderers
Fictional suicides
Golden Age supervillains
Vigilante characters in comics
Flash (comics) characters

de:Nebenfiguren im Superman-Universum#Rose und Thorn